Victoria Plucknett is a Welsh television actress, best known for playing the character of Diane Ashurst in the Welsh soap opera Pobol y Cwm and Mary in The Duchess of Duke Street.

She played WPC Beck in Z-Cars. She played Phebe in the 1978 BBC videotaped version of As You Like It.

Television

Belonging (2006)
The Sherman Plays (1997)
Y Palmant Aur (1996-1997)
The Bill (1993)
 The New Statesman (1984)
The District Nurse (1984)
What the Dickens! (1983)
Z-Cars (1978)
As You Like It (1978)
Kilvert's Diary (1977)
The Duchess of Duke Street (1976–77)
How Green Was My Valley (1975)
Pobol y Cwm (1998-2020)

Films
Cameleon (1997)

References

External links

Welsh television actresses
Living people
Welsh-speaking actors
Year of birth missing (living people)